Great tower may refer to:
The keep of a mediaeval castle
Great Tower Activity Centre, a scouting activity centre in Windermere, Cumbria, UK
Great Tower Neuwerk, Neuwerk Island, Germany